The 2011–12 Primera División Profesional season was the 65th professional top-flight football league season in Mexico. The season was split into two tournaments: the Torneo Apertura and the Torneo Clausura; each of identical format and  contested by the same eighteen teams.

Changes from 2010–11
On May 16, 2011, the General Assembly of the Primera División announced a format change to begin with the 2011 Apertura. The first change was the elimination of groups  in the First Stage. The top eight teams at the end of the First Stage would advance to the next round. The other change would affect the playoffs. Instead of a two-legged,  single elimination tournament culminating in the finals, the eight teams in the next round would be placed into two groups of four. The four teams in each group will play against other in a double round-robin format. The top team in each group will advance to the Finals. However, on June 6, 2011, the Primera División Profesional's Operations Committee announced that the format change would only affect the elimination of groups in the First Stage, and that the playoffs would remain as they were. Therefore, the top eight teams at the end of the First Stage would advance to a two-legged elimination bracket.

Clubs

The following eighteen teams participated in the season. Necaxa was relegated to the Liga de Ascenso after accumulating the lowest coefficient during the immediate past three seasons, ending its one-year stay in the league. Tijuana was promoted, the winner of the 2010–11 Liga de Ascenso season. This is Tijuana's inaugural season in the Primera División.

Managerial changes

Torneo Apertura
The 2011 Apertura was the first competition of the season. The Regular Season began on July 22, 2011 and ended on November 6, 2011. The playoffs began on November 19, 2011 and ended on December 11, 2011. The team known as Pumas UNAM were the defending champion.

Regular season

Standings

Results

Liguilla

 If the two teams are tied after both legs, the higher seeded team advances.
 Both finalists qualify to the 2012–13 CONCACAF Champions League Group Stage.

Top goalscorers
Players ranked by goals scored, then alphabetically by last name.

Hat-tricks

Torneo Clausura
The 2012 Clausura is the second and final competition of the season. The regular season began on January 6, 2012 and ended on April 29, 2012. Tigres UANL was the defending champion.

Regular season

Standings

Results

Liguilla

 If the two teams are tied after both legs, the higher seeded team advances.
 Both finalists qualify to the 2012–13 CONCACAF Champions League Group Stage. Note: Santos were already qualified to 2012-13 Champions competition as the runners-up of the Apertura, and as they are Clausura Champions, their spot was relinquished as Apertura Runner-up to Guadalajara, the best record of the 2011 Apertura not already qualified.

Top goalscorers
Players ranked by goals scored, then alphabetically by last name.

Hat-tricks

 4 Player scored 4 goals

Relegation

Updated to games played on April 29, 2012Source:

References

External links
 Clausura 2011 fixtures, tables and top scorers at ESPN Soccernet

2011–12 domestic association football leagues
1
2011-12